Enej Jelenič (born 11 December 1992) is a Slovenian footballer who plays as a midfielder for Italian Serie C club Padova.

Club career
On 10 September 2020, Jelenič signed a two-year contract with Padova.

International career
Jelenič was a young international for Slovenia. He made his senior international debut on 23 March 2016 against Macedonia.

References

External links

NZS profile 

1992 births
Living people
Sportspeople from Koper
Slovenian footballers
Association football midfielders
FC Koper players
Genoa C.F.C. players
Calcio Padova players
U.S. Livorno 1915 players
A.C. Carpi players
Slovenian PrvaLiga players
Serie A players
Serie B players
Serie C players
Slovenian expatriate footballers
Expatriate footballers in Italy
Slovenian expatriate sportspeople in Italy
Slovenia youth international footballers
Slovenia under-21 international footballers
Slovenia international footballers